Michel Hockx (born 1964) is a professor of Chinese Literature in the Department of East Asian Languages and Cultures  and the Director of the Liu Institute for Asia and Asian Studies in the Keough School of Global Affairs at the  University of Notre Dame. Hockx previously served as a Professor of Chinese at SOAS, University of London and as Founding Director of the China Institute.

He has published widely, both in English and in Chinese, on topics related to modern Chinese poetry and literary culture, especially early 20th-century Chinese magazine literature and print culture and contemporary Internet literature. He is the author of Questions of Style: Literary Societies and Literary Journals in Modern China, 1911-1937, which focuses on how the style of Republican-era Chinese literature was shaped by the context in which it was produced. His latest book, Internet Literature in China, was listed by Choice magazine as one of the “Top 25 Outstanding Academic Titles of 2015.” His ongoing research focuses on the effects of moral censorship on the preservation and digitization of modern Chinese cultural products. 

In December 2016, Hockx's first book A Snowy Morning was made freely available to download under an Open Access licence.

References

Bibliography
 A Snowy Morning: Eight Chinese Poets on the Road to Modernity, 282pp. : Leiden University. Published in 1994, .
 Questions of Style: Literary Societies and Literary Journals in Modern China, 1911–1937, 310pp. : Brill (Netherlands). Published in 2003, .
 Internet Literature in China, 272pp. : Columbia University Press. Published in 2015, .

External links
Personal Homepage at University of Notre Dame
Michel Hockx, scholar of Chinese literary and Internet culture, appointed director of Liu Institute for Asia and Asian Studies
Choice's "Outstanding Academic Titles" Top 25 Books for 2015
Review of Internet Literature in China
Review of Questions of Style

1964 births
Living people
Dutch sinologists
University of Notre Dame faculty
Academics of SOAS University of London
Leiden University alumni